Nava'i may refer to:
 Ali-Shir Nava'i
 Nava'i, Iran